Grazia Varisco (born 1937 in Milan) is an Italian visual artist and designer.

Varisco attended the Brera Academy of Fine Arts in Milan from 1956 to 1960, where she was a student of Achille Funi. In 1960 she joined Giovanni Anceschi, Davide Boriani, Gianni Colombo and Gabriele De Vecchi's kinetic art and op art Gruppo T, with whom she participated in exhibitions such as 'Arte Programmata' (Milan, 1962), 'Nouvelle tendance' (Zagreb, 1963) and the 'Miriorama' series (Milan, Genoa, Tokyo, Rome, Padua and Venice, 1960–63). Between 1961 and 1967 she worked as a graphic designer for the multinational retailer La Rinascente, the architecture and design magazine Abitare, the design company Kartell, and the Milan City Council.

Varisco is considered one of the few female artists involved in the op art movement together with Edna Andrade, Bridget Riley and Vera Molnár. Her work has been featured in many international exhibitions, including the Venice Biennale (1964, 1986 and 2022), the Rome Quadriennale (1973), the Toyama Triennale (1990); 'Force Fields: Phases of the Kinetic’ (Museu d’Art Contemporani de Barcelona and Hayward Gallery, London, 2000); 'Beyond Geometry' (Los Angeles County Museum of Art and at the Pérez Art Museum Miami, 2004) and 'Op Art' (Schirn Kunsthalle Frankfurt, 2007).

From 1981 to 2007 she was Professor of Theory of Perception at the Brera Academy of Fine Arts.

In 2007 the President of Italy Giorgio Napolitano awarded her the 'Presidente della Repubblica Prize for Sculpture' in Rome.

Selected exhibitions 
2017: Grazia Varisco: Allineamenti scorrevoli ricorrenti, Triennale Museum, Milan
2015: Grazia Varisco: Filo Rosso 1960–2015, Cortesi Gallery, Lugano, Switzerland
2014: If… Works 1959–2014, Volker Diehl Gallery, Berlin
2013: Grazia Varisco: With a Restless Gaze, Ritter Museum, Waldenbuch, Germany
2012: Ghosts in the Museum, New Museum of Contemporary Art, New York
2007: Op Art, Schirn Kunsthalle Frankfurt
2005: L'oeil moteur: Art optique e cinétique 1950–1975, Museum of Modern and Contemporary Art, Strasbourg
2005: Gli ambienti del Gruppo T: Le origini dell'arte interattiva, National Gallery of Modern Art, Rome
2000: Beyond Geometry: Experiments in forms 1940s to 1970s, Los Angeles County Museum and Miami Art Museum (now Pérez Art Museum Miami)
2000: Force Fields: Phases of the Kinetic, Barcelona Museum of Contemporary Art and Hayward Gallery, London

Bibliography 
Gillo Dorfles, Grazia Varisco 1960/1976, 1976, Edizioni del Naviglio, Milan
Giovanni Maria Accame, Grazia Varisco 1958/2000, 2001, Edizioni Maredarte, Bergamo
Jacqueline Ceresoli, Grazia Varisco: Se guardo ascolto lo spazio, 2006, Skira, Milan 
Giorgio Verzotti and Elisabetta Longari, Grazia Varisco: Se..., 2012, Edizioni Mazzotta, Milan, 
Hsiaosung Kok and Francesco Tedeschi, Grazia Varisco: Mit rastlosem Blick, 2013, Ritter Museum, Waldenbuch, 
Michele Robecchi, Grazia Varisco: If (1960–2015), 2015, Mousse Publishing, Milan

References

External links 
 Webpage of the Ritter Museum
 Wikiart's page on Grazia Varisco and her work

1937 births
Living people
20th-century Italian painters
21st-century Italian painters
20th-century Italian women artists
21st-century Italian women artists
Italian contemporary artists
Italian women painters
Op art
Academic staff of Brera Academy
Brera Academy alumni
Olivetti people